There's Gonna Be a Storm: The Complete Recordings 1966–1969 is a compilation album by American baroque pop band the Left Banke, released by Mercury Records in 1992.  It contains the entirety of the band's two 1960s albums Walk Away Renée/Pretty Ballerina and The Left Banke Too, with an additional four tracks having appeared on singles only and one previously unreleased track, as well as "Walk Away Renee" appearing as a slightly remixed version. It is currently out of print. The band enjoyed cult status in the 1990s and beyond as a definitive example of mid-1960s baroque pop.

Track listing

Tracks 1-11 are taken from the Walk Away Renée/Pretty Ballerina album, while tracks 14-17 and 19-24 are taken from The Left Banke Too.

Personnel
 Steve Martin Caro – lead vocals; drums (on "Goodbye Holly"), tambourine (on "Nice To See You"), bass (on "Bryant Hotel")
 Michael Brown – piano, harpsichord, Clavinet, organ; lead vocals (on "What Do You Know")
 Tom Finn – bass, guitar, backing vocals; lead vocals (on "Nice to See You" & "There's Gonna Be A Storm")
 George Cameron – drums, percussion, backing vocals; lead vocals (on "I Haven't Got The Nerve", "Goodbye Holly" & "Bryant Hotel")
 Warren David-Schierhorst – drums
 Jeff Winfield – electric guitar
 Rick Brand – electric guitar, banjo
 Bert Sommer – lead vocals, guitar (on "Ivy, Ivy", "And Suddenly" & "Men Are Building Sand")
 Michael McKean – guitar (on "Ivy, Ivy", "And Suddenly" & "Men Are Building Sand")
 Tom Feher – piano; guitar (on "Sing Little Bird" & "Bryant Hotel")

Additional personnel

 Steve Tallarico – backing vocals
 Paul Griffin – keyboards
 Paul Leka – piano, string arrangements
 Hugh McCracken – guitar
 Al Gorgoni – guitar
 George "Fluffer" Hirsh – guitar
 Marvin Potocki – guitars
 John Abbott – bass, guitar, string and horn arrangements
 Seymour Barab – bass, cello
 Joe Mack – bass
 Chet Amsterdam – bass
 Al Rogers – drums
 Buddy Saltzman – drums
 Bobby Gregg – drums
 Artie Schroek – vibraphone, drums, string arrangements
 Paul Leka – string arrangements
 Harry Lookofsky – violin
 George Marge – oboe
 Ray Alonge – french horn
 Marvin Stamm – trumpet
 George Young – woodwinds

References

External links
DJ Tom Finn

1992 compilation albums
The Left Banke albums
Mercury Records compilation albums